Christian Witzig (born 9 January 2001) is a Swiss professional footballer who plays as a midfielder for St. Gallen.

Club career
Witzig is a product of the youth academies of Tägerwilen, Münchwilen, Wil and St. Gallen. He began his senior career with the reserves of St. Gallen in 2017. On 24 June 2021, he signed his first professional contract with St. Gallen, tying him to the club until June 2023. He made his professional debut with St. Gallen in a 3–1 Swiss Super League loss to Sion on 27 November 2021.

International career
Witzig is a youth international for Switzerland, having played from the U15 to U17 levels. He represented the Switzerland U17s at the 2018 UEFA European Under-17 Championship.

References

External links
 
 SFL Profile

2001 births
Living people
People from Kreuzlingen District
Swiss men's footballers
Association football midfielders
Switzerland youth international footballers
Swiss Super League players
Swiss 1. Liga (football) players
FC St. Gallen players